This is a incomplete list of universities in Iraq. There are more than 85 universities and academics in total: 35 public universities, (four technical universities, one institutes of technology, and two fine arts university, one national defense university, and one police academy) 45 private universities and colleges.

Baghdad
Al Mustansiriya University
Heritage University College
Nahrain University
American University of Iraq
Iraqi University
University of Baghdad
University of Technology, Iraq

Outside Baghdad
Al Muthana University - Al Muthanna 
Babylon University - Babil 
Diyala University - Diyala 
Kirkuk University  - Kirkuk
Hawler Medical University
Kufa University  - Najaf 
Misan University - Misan
Dhi Qar University - Dhi Qar 
Tikrit University -  Salah ad Din
University of Al-Qadisiyah - Al-Qādisiyyah 
University of Anbar - Anbar 
University of Basrah - Basrah 
University of Karbala - Karbala
University of Mosul - Mosul 
University of Wasit  - Wasit
Al-Muthana University - Al-Muthana
Samarra University - Samarra

Kurdistan region
 Salahaddin University- Erbil
 University of Sulaimani
 University of Duhok
 Hawler Medical University
 Koya University
 Soran University
 University of Zakho
 University of Raparin
 Halabja University 
 Garmian University 
 Charmo University
 Erbil polytechnic university
 Sulaimani Polytechnic University
 Duhok Polytechnic University 
 University of Kurdistan Hawler
 The American University of Kurdistan
 Kurdistan Institution for Strategic Studies and Scientific Research
 Kurdistan Board for Medical Specialties

Private universities
Knowledge University - Erbil
Cihan university - Erbil, Sulaymaniyah & Duhok
Catholic University in Erbil - Erbil
Ahlulbait University College - Karbala
Al Hadbaa University College - Mosul
Al Maamoon University College - Baghdad
Al Maarif University College - Al-Anbar
Al Mansour University College - Baghdad
Al Rafidain University College - Baghdad
Al Rasheed University College - Baghdad
Al Turath University College - Baghdad
Al Yarmouk University College - Diyala 
Baghdad College of Economic Sciences University - Baghdad
Baghdad College Of Medical Sciences - Baghdad
Basrah University College of Science and Technology - Basra
Lebanese French University - Erbil
International University of Erbil

Dijlah University College - Baghdad
Humanitarian Studies University College - Najaf
Islamic University College - Najaf
Madenat Alelem University College - Baghdad
St. Clements University - Sulaimaniyah

References

Universities
Iraq, list of universities in
Iraq